Bruce Alexander Michael Brewster (born January 18, 1968), better known by his stage name Rayvon, is a Barbadian singer and songwriter, known for his work with Shaggy.

Born in Barbados, he was raised in Brooklyn, New York. He released his debut album, Hear My Cry in 1997. He had a hit in the United States in 1992 with "Big Up", which featured Shaggy, the first of a string of successful collaborations, which included "In the Summertime" and "Angel". His second album, My Bad, was released in 2002, by MCA Records.

Discography

Solo albums
 Hear My Cry (1997)
 My Bad (2002)
 Rayvon (2010)

Singles
 1992: "Big Up" (Shaggy featuring Rayvon)
 1994: "Girls Fresh" (Frankie Cutlass song) featuring Rayvon 
 1994: "No Guns, No Murder" (RAYVON)
 1995: "In the Summertime" (Shaggy featuring Rayvon) #5 UK
 2001: "Angel" (Shaggy featuring Rayvon) #1 US, #1 UK
 2002: "2-Way" #67 UK (Rayvon ft. Shaggy & RikRok)
 2007: "Out Of Control" (Shaggy featuring Rayvon)
 2011: "Selecta" (Kingston 13 Riddim)
 2014: "Way Up" (Clarence Jey featuring Rayvon)
 2015: "One More Shot" (RAYVON)
 2015: "Nobody's Business" (Myra Flynn featuring Rayvon)
 2015: "Magical (Your Love Is)  (Fish & Bammy Riddim)
 2016: "Can't Resist Your Touch" (Hypnotize Riddim)
 2016: "Nuff Tings" (Chanelle Gray featuring Rayvon)
 2017: "Sugarcane" (Rayvon & Sugar Bear)
 2017: "Trouble Again" (RAYVON)
 2018: "Blaze Like a Fire" (Rayvon & Redfox)
 2018: "Statement" (General Degree & Rayvon)
 2018: "Blaze Like A Fire" (Redbull Riddim)
 2019: "Now That We Found Love" (Rayvon & Sugar Bear)
 2019: "When She Loves Me" (Shaggy ft. Rayvon)
 2019: "I See You" (Rayvon & Sugar Bear)
 2020: "Turn Up Party" (Dj Epps ft. Rayvon)

References

External links
 OFFICIAL RAYVON WEBSITE
 RAYVON ON FACEBOOK

Barbadian reggae musicians
Reggae fusion artists
Living people
Virgin Records artists
1968 births